Piegan Mountain is located in the Lewis Range, Glacier National Park in the U.S. state of Montana.  Piegan Glacier is located in a cirque immediately southeast of the summit.

Geology

Like other mountains in Glacier National Park, Piegan Mountain is composed of sedimentary rock laid down during the Precambrian to Jurassic periods.

Climate
Based on the Köppen climate classification, it is located in an alpine subarctic climate zone with long, cold, snowy winters, and cool to warm summers. Temperatures can drop below −10 °F with wind chill factors below −30 °F.

See also
 Mountains and mountain ranges of Glacier National Park (U.S.)
 Geology of the Rocky Mountains

References

External links
 National Park Service web site: Glacier National Park
 Piegan Mountain weather: Mountain Forecast

Piegan
Piegan
Lewis Range
Mountains of Montana